Kendra Erika Fulmer (born August 12, 1993), known professionally as Kendra Erika, is an American musician.

Early life
Kendra Erika Fulmer was born in Boca Raton, Florida to parents Ingrid and Fred Fulmer. Although she loved to sing as a young child, she was born tone deaf. To overcome this, at the age of 8, she began classical musical training and performing in local theaters like the Little Palm Family Theatre in Boca Raton.

She attended Saint Andrew's School in Boca Raton. She landed the role as the Sandfairy in an operatic production of Hansel and Gretel, and Carlotta, the opera diva in The Phantom of the Opera. During her senior year, she played the Baroness in her High School’s production of The Sound of Music. Erika was a first place winner for two years in the Future Stars Talent Competition and a finalist in ‘Boca’s Entertainer of the Year’. Erika began her professional career as a teenager by singing jazz and pop music in local restaurants.

Education

She graduated Lynn University with a degree in Communication and International Business.

Music career
Erika released a song and video to her single "Dark Side" based on some of the negative aspects of the entertainment industry she witnessed at a young age. In 2014, Erika was recognized as ‘Boca’s Most Fascinating Singer’ by the Sun Sentinel  After college, Kendra moved to New York City, where she collaborated with Belgium songwriter Lynn Verlayne. Her song "Oasis" peaked at number nine in 2016, and "Under My Skin" peaked at number six in 2017, which were cowritten and produced by Damon Sharpe and Eric Sanicola, recorded in Los Angeles. In 2019, Erika's remake of Laura Branigan's "Self Control" produced by Damon Sharpe and Eric Sanicola reached number one on the Billboard Dance Music charts. As a performer, she has opened for international pop artists such as Cody Simpson and Jason Derulo.

Collaborations 
Kendra Erika has collaborated with a number of charitable causes, including the Unicorn Children's Foundation, Recovery Unplugged, MusiCares and War Child, dedicating a portion of the proceeds from her song "Song of Hope," co-written and produced by Charlie Midnight and Jan Fairchild, to help empower children impacted by war.

References

External links
 

1993 births
Living people
American women singer-songwriters
Singer-songwriters from Florida
21st-century American singers
21st-century American women singers